Marquis Hill (born April 15, 1987) is an American jazz trumpet player, composer, and bandleader from Chicago, Illinois. His musical style stems from African-American music,  incorporating hip-hop, R&B, Chicago house and neo-soul to jazz. In 2014 Hill won the Thelonious Monk Institute of Jazz International Trumpet Competition. He strongly advocates for the education of the next generation of musicians through active mentoring, treating the music he creates as a living art.

Biography 

Marquis Hill was born on the south side of Chicago in 1987. As a child, Hill first began playing the drums in the 4th grade but switched to trumpet playing in the 6th grade after hearing his older cousin practice her trumpet in the same building. After his band director, Diane Ellis, gave him a recording of Lee Morgan's Candy he fell in love with jazz. Other early influences of Hill include Dizzy Gillespie, Donald Byrd, Woody Shaw, and Kenny Dorham.

In High School, Hill studied trumpet with Pharez Whitted as well as Tito Carrillo.

Education 
Hill attended Northern Illinois University to study Music Education for his undergraduate where he studied trumpet with Mark Ponzo and worked closely with Ron Carter. Hill was recruited to Northern Illinois University by Carter via the now defunct South Shore Youth Jazz Ensemble. After completing his undergraduate at Northern Illinois University, he received his master's degree in Jazz Education from DePaul University. Upon graduating from DePaul, Hill moved to New York City in 2014.

Notable Accomplishments 
Hill is the winner of several prestigious music awards. In 2012, he won first place in the International Trumpet Guild's Jazz Improvisation Competition. In 2013, he won first in the Carmine Caruso International Jazz Trumpet Solo Competition and in 2014, Hill won the Herbie Hancock Institute of Jazz (formerly Thelonious Monk Institute of Jazz) International Trumpet Competition. Winning the Thelonious Monk competition also resulted in a recording contract with Concord Music from which Hill recorded his album The Way We Play.

Recent Activity 
Marquis Hill plays with his own group, the Marquis Hill Blacktet which formed in  2011.  He has recently toured with Marcus Miller.

In 2022, Hill toured both North America and Europe in conjunction with the release of his album New Gospel Revisited. The album features new arrangements and conceptualizations of his first album, New Gospel, from a decade prior.

Discography

As Leader 
 2022 – New Gospel Revisited (Edition Records)
 2021 – Soul Sign Instrumental (Black Unlimited Music Group)
 2020 – Soul Sign (Black Unlimited Music Group)
 2020 – Love Tape: With Voices (Black Unlimited Music Group)
 2019 – Love Tape (Black Unlimited Music Group)
 2018 – Modern Flows, Vol. 2 (Black Unlimited Music Group)
 2018 – Meditation Tape (King Legend Mic West Takeover) (Black Unlimited Music Group)
 2017 – Meditation Tape (Black Unlimited Music Group)
 2016 – The Way We Play (Concord Music Group, Inc.)
 2014 – Modern Flows EP, Vol. 1 (Skiptone Music)
 2013 – The Poet (Black Unlimited Music Group)
 2012 – Sounds of the City (Black Unlimited Music Group)
 2011 – New Gospel (Marquis Hill)

Singles and EPs 
 2020 – They Say This is Love (Black Unlimited Music Group)
 2019 – Wednesday Love (Black Unlimited Music Group)
 2019 – To You I Promise (Black Unlimited Music Group)
 2018 – Kiss and Tell (Black Unlimited Music Group)
 2018 – Ego vs. Spirit (Black Unlimited Music Group)
 2017 – Coming out of the Universe (feat. Marvin Bugulu Smith) (Black On Purpose)
 2017 – Fantasy (Tiffany Gouche' cover[feat. Harold Green III]) (Skiptone)

As Side 
 2020 — Born To Die Robin Mckelle, Doxie Records
 2020 — Endless Lawns (feat. Marquis Hill) Kurt Elling, Kurt Elling Inc.
 2015 — Far From Home Boney James Concord Music Group, Inc.
 2018 — Sin Sentido (feat. Ana Tijoux and Marquis Hill) Stu Mindeman
 2020 — EXHALE.als ZENG Ropeadope
 2020 — Maxwell Street Greg Spero, Tiny Records
 2014 — Chinchano Juan Pastor Chinchano, eyes&ears records
 2020 — It's Sunny feat. Marquis Hill G. Thomas Allen
 2015 — A New Kind of Dance, Mike Reed's People, Places & Things
 2015 — Foundation Rajiv Halim
 2014 — Perdido Dillard Center for the Arts Jazz Ensemble
 2017 — Rocket Love (feat. Marquis Hill & Morris Pleasure) J.P. Floyd
 2015 — The Return of the Gentleman (feat. Marquis Hill) LBJ

References 

American male trumpeters
21st-century trumpeters
1987 births
Living people
21st-century American male musicians